Barry Ryan (born 28 August 1978, in Ennis) is a retired Irish football goalkeeper who last played for Limerick in the League of Ireland Premier Division.

He made his League of Ireland debut for UCD away to Sligo Rovers on 15 February 1997. Barry's previous clubs include Dublin City, Shamrock Rovers and UCD.

He made his Rovers debut on 11 April 2003 keeping a clean sheet against Drogheda United but was sacked by Shamrock Rovers later that season after testing positive for cocaine. During his time with Rovers he made 4 European appearances keeping one clean sheet playing in the UEFA Intertoto-Cup and made a total of 28 appearances.

After a 9-month ban he returned with Dublin City but could not forestall the Vikings' relegation and was dropped in favour of Robbie Horgan for the final handful of games. After Dublin City became extinct, he was signed by St. Patrick's Athletic.

Ryan was released by St. Patrick's Athletic in January 2009, and moved to Galway United.

Ryan was out of contract with the west of Ireland club before the 2010 season, but his re-signing was announced on 2 February 2010.

It was announced in December 2010 that Ryan will not be renewing his contract with Galway United but instead going to Limerick for the 2011 season.

His younger brother Dave also plays in goal for Drogheda United.

On 11 December 2014, Ryan announced his retirement from football.

Honours

Club
UCD
FAI Super Cup (1): 2000

Limerick
League of Ireland First Division (1): 2012
Munster Senior Cup (1): 2011-12

Individual
SWAI Goalkeeper of the Year (1): 2002
UCD Supporters' Player of the Year (2): 2001/02, 2002/03
Galway United Supporters Trust Player of the Year (1): 2009

References

External links
Barry Ryan @ stpatsfc.com

1978 births
Living people
People from Ennis
Sportspeople from County Clare
Republic of Ireland association footballers
Association football goalkeepers
University College Dublin A.F.C. players
Shamrock Rovers F.C. players
Dublin City F.C. players
St Patrick's Athletic F.C. players
Galway United F.C. (1937–2011) players
Limerick F.C. players
League of Ireland players